Masmaje (also known as Masmadje, Mesmedje) is an Afro-Asiatic language spoken in central Chad. There are speakers in Moubi Hadaba Canton, Bitchotchi Sub-prefecture.

Notes

References 
 Alio, Khalil. 2004. Préliminaires à une étude de la langue kajakse d'Am-Dam, de toram du Salamat, d'ubi du Guéra et de masmaje du Batha-Est (Tchad). In: Gábor Takács (ed.), Egyptian and Semito-Hamitic (Afro-Asiatic) studies: in memoriam W. Vycichl,. 229–285. Leiden: Brill.
 Marti, Marianne, Calvain Mbernodji, and Katharina Wolf. 2007. L'enquete sociolinguistique des langues Birguit - Kadjakse - Masmedje du Tchad. SIL Electronic Survey Reports 2007-018. Dallas: SIL International. Online: https://sil.org/silesr/abstract.asp?ref=2007-018.

East Chadic languages
Languages of Chad